The Smith & Wesson AS (Assault Shotgun) is a prototype 12-gauge select-fire shotgun manufactured by Smith & Wesson. Its layout is similar to the M16 rifle and fed from a 10-round magazine. The AS was a rival to the Heckler & Koch HK CAWS.

See also
AO-27 rifle
Franchi SPAS-15
Daewoo USAS-12

References

Smith & Wesson firearms
Automatic shotguns
Trial and research firearms of the United States
Shotguns of the United States